Wockersee is a lake in Parchim, Mecklenburg-Vorpommern, Germany. At an elevation of 44.1 m, its surface area is 0.6 km².

External links 
 

Lakes of Mecklenburg-Western Pomerania